The Vanuatu Foreign Investment Promotion Agency (VFIPA) (previously known as the Vanuatu Foreign Investment Promotion Authority), is Vanuatu's National investment promotion agency. It was established by the foreign investment act [cap 248] in 1998 and operating as a unit under the department of Trades and Industry with a mandate to "promote and facilitate foreign investments into Vanuatu.

Under the current corporate structure of the Agency, its Chief Executive Officer is accountable to the Agency's Board of Directors known as the "Vanuatu Investment Board" that reports to the Minister responsible for the Ministry - MTTCVB. Mr Howard ARU was appointed Chief Executive Officer of the VFIPA in June 2020.

History and overview 
The Vanuatu Investment Promotion Authority (VIPA) was established following a recommendation from the Comprehensive Reform Program (CRP) undertaken in 1997 and sponsored by the Asian Development Bank (ADB). The need to have an institution aimed at developing clear guidelines governing the promotion and facilitation of foreign direct investment was a key component under the CRP strategic pillar -  Improving the incentives for private sector growth and employment. This saw the development and enactment of the Foreign Investment Act of 1998 [CAP 248] to establish the Vanuatu Investment Promotion Authority whose mandate is to expeditiously facilitate and promote foreign investment in Vanuatu.

Prior to the 1997-1998 CRP, a division within the Department of Trades and Industries was responsible for processing and approvals of foreign investment applications. The Board responsible at that time was known as the Vanuatu Foreign Investment Board (VFIB). Investment promotion and facilitation was a new development area at that time therefore the division was more focused in the processing and approval of investment proposals. But there has been too many red tapes during the process - resulting in a very costly exercise for a foreigner to do business in Vanuatu with very little or no investment promotion and facilitation at all. The recommendation by the CRP for a separate and autonomous institution was to address these issues, that will in turn contribute to an enabling business environment for the country.

In 1998 and onward, VIPA began implementing the Foreign Investment Act [CAP 248], still operating under the Public Service Commission (PSC). In 2008, VIPA was detached from the PSC and fully became a corporate body, with a board of directors as its immediate employer. Annual grant from the Government remains the only source of income for the Authority. Staff numbers began with 4 and have doubled since then with a 100% increase in its annual grant.

As in any organization, the need to excel and deliver on their missions requires effective leaders with clear visions and energy to drive strategies to achieve set targets. This has been a challenge for VIPA that saw 4 (four) different persons recruited for the CEO's position since the establishment of the authority. New staff with formal qualifications have been recruited and the composition of the VIPA BOD has seen for the first time, a private sector representative who is a business man. Prior to this, the private sector representative has been the General Manager of the Vanuatu Chamber of Commerce and Industries (VCCI).

Vanuatu's landscape for business has achieved significant improvements over the recent past. These include (i) Processing of Foreign Investment Applications improved, (ii) Business start-up requirements processes Streamlined  and (iii) Other reforms taking place in other FDI-facilitating agencies. All these are contributing to Vanuatu's ability to be able to compete for foreign direct investment in the increasingly and complicated globalized economy,

In 2019, the foreign investment Act [CAP 248] was reviewed and approved by parliament to what is now known as the "Foreign Investment Act N0. 25 of 2019". Maintaining an openness to private sector investment including foreign investment, increase in number of the private sector representation in the foreign investment board and  reserved and restricted list of investment activities are allowed to be revised every 2 years are some of the key changes the new legislation has.

Externally, VIPA has maintained its traditional working partners such as PITIC  and investment promotion agencies (IPAs) in the region. Internationally the VFIPA is a member of the World Association of Investment Promotion Agencies (WAIPA) through annual membership subscription.

Vision 

Preceding VFIPA’s formation (formerly known as VIPA), the need for FDI at that time was very crucial however, business environment was not as expected to attract foreign companies to invest in Vanuatu. The Agency’s vision of - To become the Pacific region’s leading IPA delivering excellent service and aftercare support to our existing and potential foreign investors was coined as its promotional campaign to both domestic and external investors including international partners that Vanuatu does have an IPA in place who can provide the services investors need and thus contribute to enhancing the business environment.

According the World Bank Ease of Doing Business latest (2020) Report (EoDB), Vanuatu was ranked 107 out of the 190 economies. This indicator reflected how business regulatory framework have evolved over time as a result of many factors. The VFIPA remains pro-active in its role of policy advocacy in collaboration with its key partners to push for reforms that will contribute improving the country’s EoDB ranking.

Services 
The VFIPA provides investors with information they need for making their decision. This include sector and market information, advice on available sector and industry opportunities, business start-up requirements and Government policies relating to making an investment decision in Vanuatu. The VFIPA also provide transparent and complete information about how to apply for a foreign investment application certificate (FIAC), undertake  screening and registration of all foreign investment application proposals and monitor compliance with the investment legislation. Aftercare services for policy advocacy purposes is a critical role the VFIPA is also undertaking including the fast tracking of permits and licenses issued by other Government departments.

References

Organisations based in Vanuatu
Organizations established in 1998
Economy of Vanuatu
Investment promotion agencies